Charles Polk may refer to:

 Charles Brandon Polk (b. 1984), American basketball player
 Charles Peale Polk (1767–1822), American portrait painter
 Charles Polk, Jr. (1788–1857), American politician in Delaware